Argyrophenga janitae, also known as Janita’s tussock is a species of butterfly found in the South Island of New Zealand. It was first described by R. C. Craw in 1978.

References

Satyrini
Butterflies of New Zealand
Butterflies described in 1978